Bijiang Railway Station is an elevated station of Guangzhou-Zhuhai Intercity Railway. The line started operation on January 7, 2011, but the station itself opened two years later, on February 1, 2013.

The station is located at Bijiang, Beijiao Town in Shunde District, Foshan, Guangdong, China, near China National Highway 105, Bigui Lu, Guangzhou-Zhuhai Expressway West Line and Fochen Lu. It is the first station in Shunde for the trains departing from Guangzhou South railway station.

References

Shunde District
Railway stations in China opened in 2013